Otia Ioseliani (June 16, 1930 – July 14, 2011) was a Georgian prose writer and dramatist, whose plays have been successfully staged in Georgia as well as in other countries of the former Soviet Union and East Germany.

Biography 
Otia Ioseliani was born in the village of Gvishtibi, Tsqaltubo District, in then-Soviet Georgia. He began writing in the mid-1950s and published his first collection of stories in 1957. The nationwide recognition came with his first novel The Falling Stars (ვარსკვლავთცვენა, 1962), which, like Ioseliani's many early works, treated the theme of World War II. He then tackled in his works a great variety of themes using different artistic styles. In the 1960s and 1970s, he published popular novels such as Once There Was a Woman (იყო ერთი ქალი, 1970), Taken Prisoner by Prisoners (ტყვეთა ტყვე, 1975), and a number of stories.

In the 1960s, Ioseliani first tried his hand at screen scripts and theatre plays, resulting, among others, in the comedies Until the Ox-Cart Turns Over (სანამ ურემი გადაბრუნდება, 1969) and Six Old Maids and a Man (ექვსი შინაბერა და ერთი მამაკაცი, 1971), which were successful enough to fill the theatres in East Berlin.

Ioseliani died in 2011 at the age of 81. He was buried in the yard of his own house in his native Gvishtibi according to the will of the late writer. Among his awards was Georgia's Order of Honor.

References

External links 
Otia Ioseliani at the Georgian National Filmography

1930 births
2011 deaths
Burials at Didube Pantheon
People from Imereti
Svan people
Dramatists and playwrights from Georgia (country)
Novelists from Georgia (country)
Recipients of the Order of Honor (Georgia)
20th-century novelists
20th-century dramatists and playwrights from Georgia (country)
20th-century writers from Georgia (country)